The Space Industry Act 2018 (c. 5) is an Act of Parliament of the United Kingdom introduced by Chris Grayling as Secretary of State for Transport to extend and improve the regulatory framework for commercial spaceflight activities (involving both launch to orbit and sub-orbital spaceflight) to be carried out from spaceports in the United Kingdom and launches and other activities overseas by UK entities. It operates in conjunction with the Outer Space Act 1986.

Outline of provisions 
The Act prohibits the carrying on of spaceflight and specified associated activities without a licence and breach of this prohibition will be an offence. The Secretary of State is the regulatory authority and has a duty to secure public safety in carrying out his or her functions under the Act. There are powers to enable the Civil Aviation Authority  or other persons to carry out functions on behalf of the Secretary of State. Applicants for licences will also be required to meet any requirements set out in secondary legislation made under this Act.

It creates offences including:

 Hijacking of spacecraft
 Destroying, damaging or endangering safety of spacecraft
 Endangering safety at spaceports
 Possession of a firearm or explosive at a spaceport or on a spacecraft

Prosecutions under this act require the consent of the Attorney General for England and Wales or the Director of Public Prosecutions in Northern Ireland.

References

External links
Full text of the Space Industry Act 2018
The Space Industry Act 2018 (Commencement No. 1) Regulations 2018

Space law in the United Kingdom
United Kingdom Acts of Parliament 2018
2018 in British law